Chad Murray may refer to:
Chad Murray (actor), formally known as Chad Michael Murray, American actor
Chad Murray (swimmer), Canadian swimmer, see Swimming at the 2003 Pan American Games